The Articles Declaratory of the Constitution of the Church of Scotland – often known as the Declaratory Articles - were drawn up early in the 20th century to facilitate the union of the Church of Scotland and the United Free Church of Scotland. The "declaratory" nature of the Articles means that they are intended to define or "declare" a status that already existed, but explicitly spelt out for the avoidance of doubt. By an Act of Parliament – The Church of Scotland Act 1921 – the Articles Declaratory were held to be lawful, thus recognising the Church of Scotland as the national church in Scotland but independent from the state in matters spiritual. They are still in force. Special procedures are required to amend the Articles Declaratory (see Article VIII), but Article I cannot be altered.

See also
Separation of church and state

Further reading
 The Constitution and Laws of the Church of Scotland, edited by the Very Rev Dr James L. Weatherhead, published by the Board of Practice and Procedure of the General Assembly of the Church of Scotland (Edinburgh, 1997), .

External links

 Articles Declaratory of the Constitution of the Church of Scotland at the official website of the Church of Scotland

Church of Scotland
Church order
Separation of church and state
1921 in Christianity
1921 documents
History of the Church of Scotland
1921 in law
1921 in Scotland
Christianity and law in the 20th century
Law about religion in the United Kingdom